The economy of Botswana is currently one of the world's fastest growing economies, averaging about 5% per annum over the past decade. Growth in private sector employment averaged about 10% per annum during the first 30 years of the country's independence. After a period of stagnation at the turn of the 21st century, Botswana's economy registered strong levels of growth, with GDP growth exceeding 6-7% targets. Botswana has been praised by the African Development Bank for sustaining one of the world's longest economic booms. Economic growth since the late 1960s has been on par with some of Asia's largest economies. The government has consistently maintained budget surpluses and has extensive foreign-exchange reserves.

Botswana's impressive economic record compared to some of its neighbors has been built on a foundation of diamond mining, prudent fiscal policies, and a cautious foreign policy. Botswana's economy is mostly dependent on diamond mining. Diamond mining contributes to 50% of the government revenue mainly through its 50:50 joint venture with De Beers in the Debswana Diamond Company. It is rated as the least corrupt country in Africa in the Corruption Perceptions Index by international corruption watchdog Transparency International. It has the fourth highest gross national income per capita in purchasing power in Africa and above the world average.

Trade unions represent a minority of workers in the Botswana economy. In general they are loosely organised "in-house" unions, although the Botswana Federation of Trade Unions (BFTU) is consolidating its role as the sole national trade union centre in the country.

Although Botswana's economy is considered a model for countries in the region, its heavy dependence on mining and its high rate of HIV/AIDS infection (one in every three adults is seropositive) and unemployment could threaten its success in the future.

History

Agriculture still provides a livelihood for 70% of the rural population but supplies only about 50% of food needs and accounted for only 1.8% of GDP as of 2016. Subsistence farming and cattle raising predominate. The sector is plagued by erratic rainfall and poor soils. Diamond mining and tourism are also important to the economy. Substantial mineral deposits were found in the 1970s and the mining sector grew from 25% of GDP in 1980 to 38% in 1998. Unemployment officially stood at 21% as of 2000 but unofficial estimates placed it closer to 40%.

Economic growth slowed in 2005-2008 and turned negative in 2009 as a result of the Great Recession, contracting by 5.2%. This was exacerbated by a major global downturn in the industrial sector, which shrank by 30%, Botswana's steep economic downturn contrasted with most other African nations which experienced continued growth through this period.

Some of Botswana's budget deficits can be traced to relatively high military expenditures (about 4% of GDP in 2004, according to the CIA World Factbook). Some critics have criticized this level of military spending, given the low likelihood of international conflict, but these troops are also used for multilateral operations and assistance efforts.

Trade 

Botswana is part of the Southern African Customs Union (SACU) with South Africa, Lesotho, Eswatini, and Namibia. The World Bank reports that in 2001 (the most recent year for which World Bank data is available), the SACU had a weighted average common external tariff rate of 3.6%. According to the U.S. Department of Commerce, "there are very few tariff or non-tariff barriers to trade with Botswana, apart from restrictions on licensing for some business operations, which are reserved for [Botswana] companies." Based on the revised trade factor methodology, Botswana's trade policy score is unchanged.

The main export of Botswana is diamonds. As of 2017 it is the world's second largest producer of diamonds after Russia. Due to Botswana's heavy reliance on diamonds, strong global demand is vital to the health of the economy. Diamond exports provide Botswana's economy with strong supplies of foreign exchange and have offered a basis for industrial development and stimulated improvements in Botswana's infrastructure. However, despite their preeminent role in Botswana's economy, there are concerns that diamond mines are not labour-intensive enough to provide sufficient employment for Botswana's workforce, and this mismatch has been cited as a factor in the country's structurally high unemployment rate.

Mining

Two large mining companies, Debswana (formed by the government and South Africa's De Beers in equal partnership) and Bamangwato Concessions, Ltd. (BCL, also with substantial government equity participation) operate in the country. BCL was placed in provisional liquidation in late 2016, following years of loss-making operations, and was placed into final liquidation by the High Court in June 2017.

Since early 1980s, the country has been one of the world's largest producers of gem diamonds. Four large diamond mines have opened since independence. De Beers prospectors discovered diamonds in northern Botswana in the early 1970s. The first mine began production at Orapa in 1972, followed by a smaller mine at Letlhakane. What has become the single richest diamond mine in the world opened in Jwaneng in 1982. The mine was discovered when termites looking for water brought grains of diamond to the surface. Botswana produced a total of 21.3 million carats of diamonds from the three Debswana mines in 1999, and is the highest producer of diamonds by value in the world. The Orapa 2000 Expansion of the existing Orapa mine was opened in 2000. According to Debswana, the Orapa 2000 Expansion project increase the Orapa's mine annual output from 6 million carats to 12 million carats and raised total production to 26 million carats. In 2003, Debswana opened the Damtshaa diamond mine about 220 kilometers (140 mi) west of the city of Francistown. The mine was placed into care and maintenance in December 2015 due to weak global demand but was scheduled to reopen in January 2018.
In 2008, Australia's Kimberley Diamond Company opened a mine in Lerala, Botswana's fifth mine and the first not operated by Debswana. However, Kimberley shut down the mine in May 2017, citing weak market conditions.

Most (70%) of Botswana's electricity is imported from South Africa's Eskom. 80% of domestic production is concentrated in one plant, Morupule Power Station near Palapye, operated by the Botswana Power Corporation. Debswana operates the nearby Morupule Colliery to supply coal to it. The Morupule mine exports coal to Zimbabwe, Zambia and the Democratic Republic of the Congo. In early 2008, the entire southern African region was hit hard by massive shortages of power, since the region works to share its power resources through the Southern African Power Pool, with most of its capacity coming from South Africa. Botswana has in turn put in place plans to become a net exporter of power to the regional pool, through governmental expansion of the Morupule power station, as well as encouraging private investment in the form of a 4 gigawatt power station by the Canadian greenfield company CIC Energy. In 2012, CIC Energy was acquired by India's Jindal Steel and Power. Jindal Africa currently aims to operate three surface mines in the coalfields of Mmamabula, as well as a power plant. According to the company, "the mine’s development will meet the demands of 600MW power stations and export region coal markets, with the potential to employ more than 2,000 people."

Botswana also produces soda ash through Botash, a joint venture between the government and South Africa's Chlor-Alkali Holdings (CAH) Group. Botash has been operating in the Sua Pan in northeastern Botswana since April 1991. Production of soda ash is estimated at around 300,000 tonnes per annum and is exported to South Africa, Zambia, Zimbabwe, Malawi and the Democratic Republic of the Congo.

Tourism

 Tourism is an increasingly important industry in Botswana, accounting for almost 12% of GDP. One of the world's unique ecosystems, the Okavango Delta, is located in Botswana. The country offers excellent game viewing and birding both in the Delta and in the Chobe National Park—home to one of the largest herds of free-ranging elephants in the world. Botswana's Central Kalahari Game Reserve also offers good game viewing and some of the remotest and most unspoiled wilderness in southern Africa.

A number of national parks and game reserves, with their abundant wildlife and wetlands, are major tourist attractions.

The main safari destinations for tourism are Moremi Game Reserve in the Okavango Delta, and Chobe National Park. Botswana is also participating in community-based natural resource management projects by trying to involve villagers in tourism. One example is the village of Khwai and its Khwai Development Trust.

Botswana was the setting for the 1980 movie The Gods Must Be Crazy, although the movie was mostly filmed in South Africa.
The seventh season of The Amazing Race visited Botswana. Tourism has been stimulated by the series of detective novels by Alexander McCall Smith and the American dramatisation that followed them.

Agriculture
More than half of Botswana's population lives in rural areas and depends on subsistence crops and livestock farming. Agriculture meets only a small portion of food needs and contributes just 2.6% to GDP as of 2002—primarily through beef exports—but it remains a social and cultural touchstone. Cattle raising dominated Botswana's social and economic life before independence. The Botswana Meat Commission (BMC) has a monopoly on beef production. The national herd was about 2.5 million in the mid-1990s, though the government-ordered slaughter of the entire herd in Botswana's north-west Ngamiland District in 1995 has reduced the number by at least 200,000. The slaughter was ordered to prevent the spread of "cattle lung disease" to other parts of the country. Unfortunately, their currency is Pula so money is hard to come by.

Botswana produced, in 2018:

 102 thousand tons of root and tubers;
 46 thousand tons of vegetables;
 17 thousand tons of sorghum;
 13 thousand tons of maize;
 8 thousand tons of cabbage;
 6 thousand tons of onion;
 5 thousand tons of tomato;

In addition to smaller productions of other agricultural products.

Manufacturing
Manufacturing industries in Botswana include food processing, predominantly beef processing, diamond processing, textile and garment manufacturing, beverage making, jewellery making, metals and metal products, soap making, construction materials manufacturing, and glass production.

Science and technology

There is a growing science sector in Botswana. The number of publications by Botswanan scientists catalogued in international databases increased from 133 in 2009 to 210 in 2014. In 2018, Botswana produced 281 scientific and technical journal articles. The country has one of the highest levels of scientific productivity in Sub-Saharan Africa. The country also has a high-tech industry, being home to a number of information technology companies. In 2020, Botswana's high-tech exports were worth about $16.2 million.

Private sector development and foreign investment
Botswana seeks to diversify its economy away from minerals, the earnings from which have levelled off. In 1998–99, non-mineral sectors of the economy grew at 8.9%, partially offsetting a slight 4.4% decline in the minerals sector. Foreign investment and management have been welcomed in Botswana.

External investment in Botswana has grown fitfully. In the early 1990s, two American companies, Owens Corning and H.J. Heinz, made major investments in production facilities in Botswana. In 1997, the St. Paul Group purchased Botswana Insurance, one of the country's leading short-term insurance providers. An American Business Council (ABC), with over 30 member companies, was inaugurated in 1995.

Hyundai operated a car assembly plant in Botswana from 1994 to 2000.

Botswana seeks to further diversify its economy away from minerals, which account for a quarter of GDP, down from nearly half of GDP in the early 1990s. Foreign investment and management are welcomed in Botswana and, as a result, the financial and services sectors have increased at an exponential rate in the 2000s to replace mining as the leading industry. Botswana abolished foreign exchange controls in 1999, has a low corporate tax rate (15%), no prohibitions on foreign ownership of companies, and as of 2001 had a moderate inflation rate (6.6%).

The government considers private-sector participation as being critical to the success of the country's Tenth National Development Plan (2009–2016) and enhancing the role of research and development as being the most effective way to nurture entrepreneurship and private-sector growth. The government is considering additional policies to enhance competitiveness, including a new Foreign Direct Investment Strategy, Competition Policy, Privatisation Master Plan and National Export Development Strategy.

Botswana is known to have vast coal deposits making it possibly one of the most coal-rich countries in the world. Large coal mines, massive coal-fired power plants, as well as a coals to liquid plant (through the Fischer–Tropsch process) to produce synthetic automotive fuel have been planned.

With its proven record of good economic governance, Botswana was ranked as Africa's least corrupt country in the Corruption Perceptions Index in 2020, ahead of many European and Asian countries. The World Economic Forum rated Botswana as the third most economically competitive nation in Africa as of 2002. In 2001 Botswana was once again assigned "A" grade credit ratings by Moody's and Standard & Poor's. This ranks Botswana as by far the best credit risk in Africa and puts it on par with or above many countries in central Europe, East Asia, and Latin America.

U.S. investment in Botswana remains at relatively low levels but continues to grow. Major U.S. corporations, such as Coca-Cola and H.J. Heinz, are present through direct investments, while others, such as Kentucky Fried Chicken, are present via franchise. The sovereign credit ratings by Moody's and Standard & Poor's clearly indicate that, despite continued challenges such as small market size, landlocked location, and cumbersome bureaucratic processes, Botswana remains one of the best investment opportunities in the developing world.

Due to its history and geography, Botswana has long and deep ties to the economy of South Africa. The Southern Africa Customs Union (SACU), presently comprising Namibia, Botswana,  Lesotho, Eswatini, and South Africa, dates from 1910. Under this arrangement, South Africa has collected levies from customs, sales, and excise duties for all five members, sharing out proceeds based on each country's portion of imports. The exact formula for sharing revenues and the decision-making authority over duties—held exclusively by the Government of South Africa—became increasingly controversial, and the members renegotiated the arrangement in 2001. The new structure has now been formally ratified and a SACU Secretariat has been established in Windhoek, Namibia. Following South Africa's accession to the World Trade Organization (WTO), Botswana also joined; many of the SACU duties are thus declining, making products from outside the area more competitive in Botswana. Currently, the SACU countries and the U.S. are negotiating a free trade agreement. Botswana is currently also negotiating a free trade agreement with Mercosur and an Economic Partnership Agreement with the European Union as part of SADC.

Gaborone is host to the headquarters of the fourteen-nation Southern African Development Community (SADC), a successor to the Southern African Development Coordination Conference (SADCC, established in 1980), which focused its efforts on freeing regional economic development from dependence on apartheid South Africa. SADC embraced the newly democratic South Africa as a member in 1994 and has a broad mandate to encourage growth, development, and economic integration in Southern Africa. SADC's Trade Protocol, which was launched on 1 September 2000, calls for the elimination of all tariff and non-tariff barriers to trade by 2012 among the 11 signatory countries. If successful, it will give Botswana companies free access to the far larger regional market. SADC's failure to distance itself from the Mugabe government in Zimbabwe has diminished the number of opportunities for cooperation between the U.S. and SADC.

Botswana has successfully carried an Action Programme on the Elimination of Child Labour, which was adopted in the period 2006–2007. Free the Children delisted Botswana as a nation harbouring child-labour facilities in 2008.

Financial sector
Botswana has a growing financial sector, and the country's national stock market, the Botswana Stock Exchange (BSE), based in Gaborone, is given the responsibility to operate and regulate the equities and fixed interest securities market. Formally established in 1989, the BSE continues to be pivotal to Botswana's financial system, and in particular the capital market, as an avenue on which government, quasi-government and the private sector can raise debt and equity capital. Although the BSE has just under 40 companies listed, it plays host to the most pre-eminent companies doing business in Botswana. These companies represent a spectrum of industries and commerce, from Banking and financial services to Wholesaling and Retailing, Tourism and Information Technology.

To date, the BSE is one of Africa's best performing stock exchanges, averaging 24% aggregate return in the past decade. This has allowed the BSE to be the third largest stock exchange, in terms of market capitalisation, in Southern Africa.

Given Botswana's lack of exchange controls, stable currency and exceptionally performing stock market, the financial sector has attracted a host of global investors seeking better returns.

Botswana's currency, the pula, is fully convertible and is valued against a basket of currencies heavily weighted toward the South African Rand. Profits and direct investment can be repatriated without restriction from Botswana. The Botswana Government eliminated all exchange controls in 1999. The Central Bank devalued the Pula by 7.5% in February 2004 in a bid to maintain export competitiveness against the real appreciation of the Pula. There was a further 12% devaluation in May 2005 and the policy of a "Crawling peg" was adopted.

The recently established Non-Bank Financial Institutions Regulatory Authority (NBFIRA) is responsible for the oversight of all non-banking financial services entities in the country. As of 2005, about 54% of Botswana's population had access to formal or informal financial services, and 43% is banked (with access to at least one formal banking product). The overall access ratio is still low, especially in rural areas, where there are 3.8 branches and 73 ATMs per 100,000 people. Mobile banking services have just started to be offered. In recent years the government and Central Bank have undertaken serious steps to modernize the country's payment system infrastructure. These efforts included the establishment of a code-line clearing system for the exchange of cheques and electronic funds as well as a Real Time Gross Settlement (RTGS) system, including SWIFT connection. The stock exchange implemented a Central Securities Depository in 2007. Remittance Flows for Botswana amounted to US$117 million in 2007, a figure that is higher than the total net value of official development assistance.

Gaborone is host to the headquarters of the 14-nation Southern African Development Community (SADC). A successor to the Southern African Development Coordination Conference (SADCC), which focused its efforts on freeing regional economic development from dependence on apartheid in South Africa, SADC embraced the newly democratic South Africa as a member in 1994 and has a broad mandate to encourage growth, development, and economic integration in Southern Africa. SADC's Trade Protocol, which was launched on 1 September 2000, calls for the elimination of all tariff and non-tariff barriers to trade by 2012 among the 11 signatory countries. If successful, it will give Botswana companies free access to the far larger regional market. The Regional Centre for Southern Africa (RCSA), which implements the U.S. Agency for International Development's (USAID) Initiative for Southern Africa (ISA), is headquartered in Gaborone as well.

Main indicators
The following table shows the main economic indicators in 1980–2017.

See also
 Botswana
 Education in Botswana
 List of Botswana companies
 Science and technology in Botswana
 United Nations Economic Commission for Africa

References

External links
 
 Botswana latest trade data on ITC Trade Map
 MBendi Botswana overview

 
Botswana
Botswana